is a railway station in the city of  Kashiwazaki, Niigata, Japan, operated by the East Japan Railway Company (JR East).

Lines

Station layout

The station consists of two ground-level opposed side platforms connected by a footbridge, serving two tracks. The station is unattended.

Platforms

History
Kujiranami Station opened on 1 April 1904. With the privatization of Japanese National Railways (JNR) on 1 April 1987, the station came under the control of JR East. A new station building was completed in 2004.

Surrounding area

Kujiranami Swimming Beach
Kashiwazaki Marina

See also
 List of railway stations in Japan

External links

 JR East station information 

Railway stations in Niigata Prefecture
Railway stations in Japan opened in 1904
Shin'etsu Main Line
Stations of East Japan Railway Company
Kashiwazaki, Niigata